Girl Friday may refer to:

 Girl Friday (idiom), a feminine variation of the phrase "Man Friday"
 Girl Friday (TV series), a 1994 BBC television reality show
 Girl Friday, a 2009 TV pilot for Channel 4's Comedy Showcase 
 His Girl Friday, a 1940 motion picture